In mathematics, the tensor product of two algebras over a commutative ring R is also an R-algebra. This gives the tensor product of algebras. When the ring is a field, the most common application of such products is to describe the product of algebra representations.

Definition
Let R be a commutative ring and let A and B be R-algebras. Since A and B may both be regarded as R-modules, their tensor product

is also an R-module. The tensor product can be given the structure of a ring by defining the product on elements of the form  by

The tensor product turns the category of R-algebras into a symmetric monoidal category.

Further properties
There are natural homomorphisms from A and B to  given by

These maps make the tensor product the coproduct in the category of commutative R-algebras. The tensor product is not the coproduct in the category of all R-algebras. There the coproduct is given by a more general free product of algebras. Nevertheless, the tensor product of non-commutative algebras can be described by a universal property similar to that of the coproduct:

where [-, -] denotes the commutator.
The natural isomorphism is given by identifying a morphism  on the left hand side with the pair of morphisms  on the right hand side where  and similarly .

Applications
The tensor product of commutative algebras is of frequent use in algebraic geometry. For affine schemes X, Y, Z with morphisms from X and Z to Y, so X = Spec(A), Y = Spec(R), and Z = Spec(B) for some commutative rings A, R, B, the fiber product scheme is the affine scheme corresponding to the tensor product of algebras:

More generally, the fiber product of schemes is defined by gluing together affine fiber products of this form.

Examples

 Tensor products can be used as a means of changing coefficients.
 Tensor products also can be used for taking products of affine schemes over a field. For example,  is isomorphic to the algebra  which corresponds to an affine surface in  if f and g are not zero.

See also
Extension of scalars
Tensor product of modules
Tensor product of fields
Linearly disjoint
Multilinear subspace learning

Notes

References 
 .
 

Algebras
Ring theory
Commutative algebra
Multilinear algebra